Hubert Charles Sumlin (November 16, 1931 – December 4, 2011) was a Chicago blues guitarist and singer, best known for his "wrenched, shattering bursts of notes, sudden cliff-hanger silences and daring rhythmic suspensions" as a member of Howlin' Wolf's band. He was ranked number 43 in Rolling Stones "100 Greatest Guitarists of All Time".

Biography
Sumlin was born in Greenwood, Mississippi, and raised in Hughes, Arkansas. He got his first guitar when he was eight years old. As a boy, he met Howlin' Wolf by sneaking into a performance.

Wolf relocated from Memphis to Chicago in 1953, but his longtime guitarist Willie Johnson chose not to join him. In Chicago, Wolf hired the guitarist Jody Williams, but in 1954 he invited Sumlin to move to Chicago to play second guitar in his band. Williams left the band in 1955, leaving Sumlin as the primary guitarist, a position he held almost continuously (except for a brief spell playing with Muddy Waters around 1956) for the remainder of Wolf's career. According to Sumlin, Howlin' Wolf sent him to a classical guitar instructor at the Chicago Conservatory of Music to learn keyboards and scales. Sumlin played on the album Howlin' Wolf (called the "rocking chair album", with reference to its  cover illustration), which was named the third greatest guitar album of all time by Mojo magazine in 2004.

Upon Wolf's death in 1976, Sumlin continued playing with several other members of Wolf's band, as the Wolf Gang, until about 1980. He also recorded under his own name, beginning with a session from a tour of Europe with Wolf in 1964. His last solo album was About Them Shoes, released in 2004 by Tone-Cool Records. He underwent lung removal surgery the same year, but he continued performing until just before his death. His final recording, just days before his death, was tracks for an album by Stephen Dale Petit, Cracking The Code (333 Records).

Sumlin was inducted into the Blues Foundation Hall of Fame in 2008. He was nominated for four Grammy Awards: in 1999 for the album Tribute to Howlin' Wolf, with Henry Gray, Calvin Jones, Sam Lay, and Colin Linden; in 2000 for Legends, with Pinetop Perkins; in 2006, for his solo project About Them Shoes (which features performances by Keith Richards, Eric Clapton, Levon Helm, David Johansen and James Cotton) and in 2010 for his contribution to Kenny Wayne Shepherd's Live! in Chicago. He won multiple Blues Music Awards. He was a judge for the fifth annual Independent Music Awards, given to support the careers of independent artists.

Sumlin lived in Totowa, New Jersey for 10 years before his death.  He died of heart failure on December 4, 2011, at the age of 80, in a hospital in Wayne, New Jersey. Mick Jagger and Keith Richards paid Sumlin's funeral expenses.

Partial discography

References

External links

 
 Hubert Sumlin biography at About.com
 BBC review of About Them Shoes
 Illustrated Hubert Sumlin discography

1931 births
People from Greenwood, Mississippi
People from Totowa, New Jersey
American blues guitarists
American male guitarists
American blues singers
Blues musicians from Mississippi
Chicago blues musicians
Black Top Records artists
2011 deaths
Guitarists from Illinois
Guitarists from Mississippi
20th-century American guitarists
20th-century American male musicians
Blind Pig Records artists
Telarc Records artists
Chess Records artists
Black & Blue Records artists
African-American guitarists
20th-century African-American male singers
21st-century African-American male singers